Haller–Gibboney Rock House is a historic home located at Wytheville, Wythe County, Virginia. It was built in 1822–1823, and is a two-story, five bay late Federal style limestone dwelling.  It has a side gable roof and a two-story frame ell terminating in a demi-octagonal end. The Rock House was used as a hospital during the Battle of Wytheville during Civil War. The building houses a museum sponsored by the Wythe County Historical Society.

It was listed on the National Register of Historic Places in 1972.

References

External links
 Haller–Gibboney Rock House Museum

Historic house museums in Virginia
Houses on the National Register of Historic Places in Virginia
Federal architecture in Virginia
Houses completed in 1823
Houses in Wythe County, Virginia
National Register of Historic Places in Wythe County, Virginia
Museums in Wythe County, Virginia
Individually listed contributing properties to historic districts on the National Register in Virginia